Heera is a 1973 film produced and directed by Sultan Ahmed. The film stars Sunil Dutt, Asha Parekh and Shatrughan Sinha in lead roles. The film was a "Hit" at the box office and ranked 9th among the top grossers of 1973

Plot
Heera lives in a small rural town in India with his father, a Magistrate, and housewife mother. He meets with the town's moneylender Dhaniram's daughter, Asha, both of them fall in love, and hope to get married soon. Before that could happen, Changu's daughter is killed and the blame put on Heera. Heera runs away to clear his name which he does in the end.

Cast
 Sunil Dutt as Heera
 Asha Parekh as Asha
 Shatrughan Sinha as Balwant 
 Farida Jalal as Lahariya
 Nazir Hussain as Magistrate
 Sulochana Latkar as Heera's Mother
 Anwar Hussain as Changu
 Mukri as Manglu
 Randhir as Makhanlal
 Kanhaiyalal as Lala Dhaniram
 Faryal as Gulabi
 Satyen Kappu as Heera's employer in the city
 Mac Mohan as member of the kidnapping gang
 Tabassum as Asha's friend
 Asha Potdar (guest appearance) ..girl who dies of snake bite
 Helen as and item number "Der Na Karo"

Music
Kalyanji Anandji composed the music and Anjaan and Indivar wrote the lyrics.
 "Chaley Chaley Re Pawan" - Lata Mangeshkar
 "Aaj Nachoon Aise" - Lata Mangeshkar and Shatrughan Sinha
 "Ek Chhokariya" - Kishore Kumar, Asha Bhosle, Usha Khanna, Mukri and Chorus
 "Main Tuhse Milne Aayi" - Lata Mangeshkar and Mohammed Rafi
 "Der Na Karo" - Lata Mangeshkar

References

External links 
 

1973 films
1970s Hindi-language films
Indian crime drama films